Domingo García Ramos (August 1911 in Tula de Allende, Hidalgo – 1978 in Mexico City) was a prominent Mexican architect. He is the author of several books:

 Iniciación al Urbanismo (1961)
 Arquitectura y artes decorativas (1966)
 Primeros pasos en diseño urbano (1968)
 Planificación de edificios para la enseñanza (1971)
 Todos Tenemos la Culpa... y por eso estamos como estamos (1977)

References

1911 births
1978 deaths
20th-century Mexican architects